Sa Bilis Walang Kaparis is a 1964 Tagalog language black and white action movie made in the Philippines. It was directed by Jose de Villa and distributed by Sampaguita Pictures.

Synopsis

Cast 
 Susan Roces
 Vic Vargas
 Lolita Rodriguez
 Pepito Rodriguez
 Charlie Davao
 Martin Marfil
 Gina Pareño
 Boy Alano
 German Moreno
 Jose Morelos
 Ray Marcos
 Lilian Laing
 Bella Flores
 Rod Navarro
 Nori Dalisay
 Matimtiman Cruz
 Willie Dado
 Jaime Javier

References

External links
 

1964 films
Tagalog-language films
1960s action films
Philippine action films